Alex Parsons may refer to:

 Alex Parsons (American football) (born 1987), American football offensive guard
 Alex Parsons (footballer, born 1992), English footballer
 Alex Parsons (soccer), Australian soccer player